Waterfall, Virginia is an unincorporated community located in Western Prince William County, Virginia.  Waterfall sits at the foot of Bull Run Mountains, the easternmost front of the Blue Ridge Mountains.

References

Unincorporated communities in Prince William County, Virginia
Washington metropolitan area
Unincorporated communities in Virginia